Frederick Harding Hale (December 8, 1844 – June 14, 1912) was a Canadian lumber merchant and politician.

Born in Northampton, Carleton County, New Brunswick, the son of Martin Hale and Hulda Dickinson, Hale was involved in the manufacture and sale of all kinds of lumber at Northampton and Woodstock. He was elected to the House of Commons of Canada for the electoral district of Carleton in the 1887 federal election. A Liberal-Conservative, he was re-elected in 1896 and 1900. He was defeated in the 1904 election.

He died on June 14, 1912.

Electoral record

References

 
 

1844 births
1912 deaths
Conservative Party of Canada (1867–1942) MPs
Members of the House of Commons of Canada from New Brunswick